Sebastian is one of the main characters from William Shakespeare's play Twelfth Night, believed to have been written around 1600 or 1601.

Background
Sebastian is the twin brother of Viola. After the beginning of the play, Viola mentions that her brother Sebastian is drowned in the sea.

The next appearance of Sebastian denies this, as he has been rescued by Antonio, a sea captain who looks after Sebastian at some risk to himself. After three months with Antonio, Sebastian decides to set out to Illyria, ruled by Duke Orsino. Meanwhile, Viola has disguised herself as a male page named Cesario and works for the Duke. A love triangle situation ensues, where the Duke is in love with Countess Olivia, Viola falls in love with the Duke, and Olivia falls in love with Viola, thinking she is a man.

Because they look so much alike, when Olivia sees Sebastian later, after he has not backed down from a challenge by Sir Andrew Aguecheek, she thinks he is "Cesario". She asks him to marry her, to which Sebastian agrees. When Viola appears with the duke, the siblings are reunited and the Duke resolves to marry Viola.

Character interpretation
Sebastian's character is necessary to allow Viola to unravel the roles she has accumulated in the play, and to allow her to return to being a woman, and allowing her to marry Orsino. Sebastian also has a part of his own; later on he marries Countess Olivia, whom Orsino had previously loved.

References

Sources
 Guide to Twelfth Night
 Google books Shakespeare's Twelfth Night, or What You Will

Characters in Twelfth Night
Fictional castaways
Fictional twins
Male Shakespearean characters